Karl Gustaf Wilhelm Dyrsch (28 August 1890 – 7 May 1974) was a Swedish Army officer and horse rider who competed in the 1920 Summer Olympics. He and his horse Salamis were part of the Swedish team that won the gold medal in eventing. However, Dyrsch did not receive a medal as he failed to complete his individual routine.

Dyrsch was a career military officer holding the rank of lieutenant colonel in 1947.

References

1890 births
1974 deaths
Swedish event riders
Olympic equestrians of Sweden
Swedish male equestrians
Equestrians at the 1920 Summer Olympics
Olympic gold medalists for Sweden
Olympic medalists in equestrian
Swedish Army colonels
Military personnel from Stockholm
Medalists at the 1920 Summer Olympics
Sportspeople from Stockholm